Marcel van Heerden (born 1952), is a South African actor and director. He is best known for his roles in the popular films The Flyer, Mandela: Long Walk to Freedom and White Wedding.

Personal life
Van Heerden was born in 1952 in Cape Town and grew up Stellenbosch, South Africa. His mother Marie van Heerden, was a stage director and actress. He has one brother, Johann van Heerden.

Van Heerden was in a relationship with the singer, Juliana Venter with whom he also collaborated in the performance group Mud Ensemble in the 1990s. The couple has one son, Vincent.

Career
Van Heerden studied drama at the University of Stellenbosch Drama Department. He then moved to the University of Cape Town Drama Department and studied under renowned artists Robert Mohr and Mavis Taylor. Meanwhile, he qualified with a Bilingual Performers Diploma in Speech and Drama in 1975. He later become one of the first Afrikaans actors to work consistently in the anti-apartheid theaters, The Space theater and The Market Theater.

He made notable appearances in the films such as Mapantsula, The Flyer, White Wedding, Durban Poison, Long Walk to Freedom, Pad na Jou Hart and n Pawpaw vir my Darling. In the meantime, he also joined with several television serials such as Konings, Onder Draai die Duiwel Rond and The Outcast.

Apart from acting, he is also a prolific voice artist and dubbing director. In 2015, he wrote and directed the short film Vryslag was chosen as the Best Short Film at 2015's Silwerskerm Film Festival in Cape Town. In 2013, he transformed the short Vryslag as a radio drama, which won the Sanlam-RSG Award at Radio Playwright Competition.

Partial filmography

References

External links
 

Living people
South African male television actors
1952 births
South African male film actors
South African male stage actors